Lioptilodes cuzcoicus is a moth of the family Pterophoridae. It is known from Ecuador and Peru.

The wingspan is about 23 mm. Adults are on wing in August.

This species is characterized by the relatively small second lobe of the forewing.

References

Platyptiliini
Moths described in 1996